Peusangan River is a river in northern Sumatra, Indonesia, about 1700 km northwest of the capital Jakarta.

Geography
The river flows in the northern area of Sumatra with predominantly tropical rainforest climate (designated as Af in the Köppen-Geiger climate classification). The annual average temperature in the area is 25 °C. The warmest month is July, when the average temperature is around 27 °C, and the coldest is January, at 24 °C. The average annual rainfall is 2431 mm. The wettest month is December, with an average of 415 mm rainfall, and the driest is July, with 106 mm rainfall.

See also
List of rivers of Indonesia
List of rivers of Sumatra

References

Rivers of Aceh
Rivers of Indonesia